Te Ringa Mangu Mihaka or Dun Mihaka is a Māori activist, author, and political candidate in New Zealand.

Mihaka has been involved in a number of campaigns regarding Māori rights, and was involved in the Bastion Point land dispute. His 1979 attempts to use Māori language in court were appealed to the Court of Appeal and were the trigger for the 1986 Waitangi Tribunal ruling that the government should introduce legislation making it an official language of New Zealand. He has written two books on Māori issues. He is most known, however, for performing an act of whakapohane (baring his buttocks, a traditional Māori insult) to Diana, Princess of Wales and Charles, Prince of Wales in 1983. Some sources claim this was actually directed at the Queen herself, however, this is likely confused with a later incident in 1986 in which Mihaka was arrested for driving a van with an image of whakapohane in the vicinity of a royal motorcade; on that occasion, he was charged with dangerous driving.

In 2010 he was sentenced to 28 days in jail for contempt of court for calling a District Court judge an arsehole in open court.

New Zealand election campaigns 

He stood as an independent candidate for the Te Tai Tokerau parliamentary seat in the 1999 election, winning 1.03% of the vote. In 2004, he stood in the Te Tai Hauauru by-election, challenging the incumbent Tariana Turia. Mihaka stood as the candidate for the Aotearoa Legalise Cannabis Party, the only party other than Turia's Māori Party to contest the by-election. Mihaka claimed that the drugs issue was of greater importance to Māori than the foreshore and seabed controversy, which Turia largely focused on. In the by-election, Mihaka placed a distant second, winning 2.52% of the vote compared to Turia's 92.74%. He did, however, place above the four independent candidates.

References

New Zealand psychedelic drug advocates
Māori activists
Year of birth missing (living people)
Living people
Aotearoa Legalise Cannabis Party politicians
Māori language revivalists
Unsuccessful candidates in the 1999 New Zealand general election